Giorgio Papi (1917–2002) was an Italian film producer and production manager.

He met Orson Welles in the set of Black Magic (1949), where he was the head of production, and they worked in Othello (1951).

He produced along Arrigo Colombo Per un pugno di dollari (1964). Both hired Sergio Leone to direct the film with a budget of 200.000 dollars. In 1964 they founded Jolly Film, and they produced Duello nel Texas (1963), and Ad ogni costo (1967), between others.

He was member of the jury at the Cannes Film Festival in 1972.

Filmography
 Sacco & Vanzetti (1971)
 Violent City (1970)
 Grand Slam (1967)
 A Fistful of Dollars (1964)
 Inspector Maigret (1958)
 The Intruder (1956)
 Othello (1951)
 Cagliostro (1949)
 Te amaré siempre (1943)
 Four Steps in the Clouds (1942)
 Before the Postman (1942)

References

External links
 
 

1917 births
2002 deaths
Italian film producers
Cannes Film Festival